James Spencer Drury Gnodde (born 9 November 1995) is an English former first-class cricketer.

Early life and career 
Gnodde was born at Westminster in November 1995.  He was educated at Eton College (2009–14), before going up to Pembroke College, Oxford 2014–18).  While studying at Oxford he played first-class cricket, making his debut for Oxford University against Cambridge University in The University Match of 2015, with Gnodde also featuring in its 2016, 2017 and 2018 fixtures.  In his four first-class matches for Oxford University, he scored 113 runs at an average of 18.83 and a high score of 54.  In addition to playing for Oxford University, he also made a single first-class appearance for Oxford MCCU against Kent at Canterbury in 2018.

Notes and references

External links

1995 births
Living people
People from Westminster
People educated at Eton College
Alumni of Pembroke College, Oxford
English cricketers
Oxford University cricketers
Oxford MCCU cricketers